Howard Hayes may refer to:

 Howard Hayes (athlete) (1877–1937), American athlete
 Howard Hayes (boxer) (born 1949), British boxer
 Howard Hayes Scullard (1903–1983), British historian